Agnes Flora (born June 18, 1987 - August 8, 2005) by Royal Ski, and out of Agnes Lady at Masayoshi Orite was a bay racehorse who won the Oka Sho in Japan. She is also known as the dam of Agnes Flight and Agnes Tachyon, the former a Derby winner and the latter the Leading Sire of Japan in 2008.

Life and career
Agnes Flora was a bay mare by Royal Ski, and out of Agnes Lady. She was mostly known for her major win at the Oka Sho carrying four hundred and fifty-two pounds. She also won the Tulip Sho and Elfin Stakes in Japan. In 1990, Agnes Flora won the JRA Award for "Best Three-Year-Old Filly."

She was retired from racing  soon after coming in second place behind Eishin Sunny at the Yushun Himba in 1990 after developing symptoms of tendonitis while in the process of recovering from a cracked bone.

Flora died on August 8, 2005.

Pedigree

References 

1987 racehorse births
2005 racehorse deaths
racehorses bred in Japan
racehorses trained in Japan
Thoroughbred family 1-l